José Gonçalves da Silva (December 22, 1838 – August 15, 1911) was a Brazilian politician who served as the governor of Bahia in 1890.

History

Biography 
Gonçalves Silva completed his first studies in Salvador at Colégio Pereira. In 1854, he enrolled at the Law School of Recife where he remained until the third year, completing the course in São Paulo, in 1859.

Still in the imperial period, he was provincial deputy (1868) and general deputy (current federal deputy) (1869-1872). In the Republic, he held the position of state senator, concomitantly with that of governor, acting in the Federalist Republican Party, which he presided over, until he was removed by Luís Viana, as a result of his deposition.

Government of Bahia 
A troubled political moment occurred with the government of José Gonçalves. Appointed to the post by President Deodoro da Fonseca, replacing his brother who became ill, he took over on November 16, 1890, with the main task of managing the administration while forming the state Constituent Assembly.

As governor, he presided over the solemnity of the installation of the Faculty of Law of Bahia, now a member of the Federal University of Bahia.

This, chaired by councillor Luís Viana, was composed of a senate and a state chamber. The new Magna Carta was drawn up, it was up to the same Assembly to elect the new governor on July 2 (the state's maximum date) of 1891.

By a large majority of the collegiate, José Gonçalves remains in his post. On November 3 of the same year occurs the Coup d'état promoted by Marshal Deodoro, against which the Democratic Republicans are emerging throughout the country. However, it was not the case of the Governor of Bahia: José Gonçalves, contrary to the opinion of everyone in the state, sends a message of support for the closing of the Congress that had then been rehearsed.

An uprising is formed at The Square of Piety, captained by the tribune César Zama, of inflamed verb and master in the oratory. The people rise, surrounding the governor in his residence, where some militiamen took place - but not the military. Shots are fired, people die, and José Gonçalves refuses to give in.

Urged by General Tude Soares Neiva, commander of the 13th Military District, however, he has no alternative: he delivers the post in order to avoid a major disaster. 
Thus, in a melancholic way, it would pass to history as the first constitutional governor of the state of Bahia, and the only one deposed by the people, on November 24, 1891.

References 

1838 births
1911 deaths